Mostafa Fathalla Mohamed is an Egyptian Paralympic track and field athlete who competes in T37 sprint events.

Career 
Mostafa claimed gold medal in the men's 100 m T37 event at the 2011 IPC Athletics World Championships which was also eventually his first medal at the IPC Athletics World Championships. The 2011 IPC Athletics World Championships also marked his maiden appearance at the IPC Athletics World Championships.

He made his debut appearance at the Paralympics representing Egypt at the 2012 Summer Paralympics and competed in the men's 100m T37 and men's 200m T37 events. He claimed a silver medal in his second Paralympic appearance representing Egypt at the 2016 Summer Paralympics in the men's 100m T37 category. In addition, he also took part in the men's 400m T37 event where he narrowly missed out on a bronze medal claiming fourth place.

References 

Living people
Paralympic athletes of Egypt
Egyptian male sprinters
Medalists at the 2016 Summer Paralympics
Paralympic silver medalists for Egypt
Place of birth missing (living people)
Track and field athletes with disabilities
Paralympic medalists in athletics (track and field)
Athletes (track and field) at the 2012 Summer Paralympics
Athletes (track and field) at the 2016 Summer Paralympics
Athletes (track and field) at the 2020 Summer Paralympics
Year of birth missing (living people)